Pogrzebień  is a village in the administrative district of Gmina Kornowac, within Racibórz County, Silesian Voivodeship, in southern Poland.

The village has a population of 1,100.

History

Other names 
 1258 Pohrzebynia
 1264 Pogrebyna, Pogrzebyna
 1313 Pogrebina
 1358 Pogrebine
 1532 Pohrebin
 1679 Pogrzebien

References

 Nouveau traité de géographie, Volume 6, Nouveau traité de géographie, Anton Friedrich Büsching, Anton Friedrich Büsching, P. Gosse jr. D. Pinet, 1772
 Archiv für slavische Philologie, Volume 20, Veröffentlichungen des Instituts für Slawistik, Weidmann., 1812-1898
 Wisła: miesięcznik geograficzno-etnograficzny, (Vol. 19), M. Arcta., 1905
 Rozprawy, Volumes 1–3, Wydawnictwa Łódzkiego Towarzystwa Naukowego - Łódzkie Towarzystwo Naukowe, Zakład im. Ossolinskich, 1954
Погребной (in Russian)

Villages in Racibórz County